Nova Palma is a municipality in the state of Rio Grande do Sul, Brazil.

The municipality contains part of the hydroelectric Dona Francisca Dam on the upper Jacuí River.

See also
List of municipalities in Rio Grande do Sul

References

Municipalities in Rio Grande do Sul